Olivia's Live Hits is a live album released in 2008, based on the tour of Olivia Newton-John in Sydney Opera House in 2006. A DVD called Live at the Sydney Opera House was also recorded.

Production
The album was recorded with the Sydney Symphony, the tour held four concerts and 27 tracks, but only 10 appear on the album.

Track listing
"Have You Never Been Mellow" (03:46)
"Magic" (04:35)
"Hopelessly Devoted To You" (03:01)
"You're The One That I Want" (03:52)
"Xanadu" (03:31)
"Suddenly" (04:12)
"Physical" (04:44)
"Don't Stop Believin'" (03:49)
"If Not For You" (01:56)
"I Honestly Love You" (04:23)

Musicians
Andy Timmons - Guitar, vocals
Dan Wojciechowski - Battery
Lee Hendricks - Low
Catherine Marx - Keyboards
Warren Ham - Puffs, vocals
Steve Real - Vocals
Carmella Ramsey - Vocals

Olivia Newton-John live albums
2008 live albums
Albums recorded at the Sydney Opera House